North Carolina Highway 400 (NC 400) is the shortest primary state highway in the U.S. state of North Carolina. The route traverses from its western terminus at US 64 to the Elizabeth II vessel (State Historic Site) docked on Ice Plant Island, located in Shallowbag Bay. Unlike other state routes, all of the NC 400 markers have brown recreational backgrounds. The route is split among two one-way streets: eastbound and westbound.

Route description 
NC 400 begins at an intersection with US 64 in the town of Manteo. The route begins as a pair of one-way street, with NC 400 heading eastbound along Fernando Street and westbound along Ananias Dare Street. The eastbound direction heads through a residential portion of Manteo, running along Fernando Street, turning northward at an intersection with Queen Elizabeth Street, where it heads to Ananias Dare Street, meeting with the westbound alignment of NC 400.  There, the now two-way street heads eastward as Festival Park, crossing Dough's Creek and entering the Roanoke Waterfront, where the Elizabeth II, a ship declared historic by the state of North Carolina, is docked. This also serves as the eastern terminus of NC 400.

History

Major intersections

References

External links

400
Transportation in Dare County, North Carolina
Roanoke Island